The Philadelphia Lumberjacks were a basketball team that played in the Eastern Professional Basketball League in the 1947-48 season.  The franchise did not have a steady home court, playing several home games at Philadelphia's Metropolitan Opera House, then later at a Masonic temple.  By January 1948, the franchise lost their home courts, and finished the season as a "traveling squad."

Continental Basketball Association teams
Basketball teams in Philadelphia